The 2007–08 Liga Gimel season saw 86 clubs competing in 6 regional divisions for promotion to Liga Bet.

Upper Galilee Division

Jezreel Division

Samaria Division

Sharon Division

Tel Aviv Division

Central Division

References
Liga Gimel Upper Galilee The Israel Football Association 
Liga Gimel Jezreel The Israel Football Association 
Liga Gimel Samaria The Israel Football Association 
Liga Gimel Sharon The Israel Football Association 
Liga Gimel Tel Aviv The Israel Football Association 
Liga Gimel Central The Israel Football Association 

6
Liga Gimel seasons